Walking shoes may refer to:

Footwear
 Sneakers, shoes primarily designed for sports but widely used for everyday wear.
 Hiking boots, designed for protecting the feet and ankles during outdoor walking activities.

Music
 "Walkin' Shoes", a jazz composition by Gerry Mulligan from 1952.
 "Walking Shoes", a country-music song written by Paul Kennerley from 1990.